Lei Tung may refer to:
 Lei Tung Estate, a public housing estate in Ap Lei Chau, Hong Kong
 Lei Tung station, an MTR rapid transit station adjacent to the estate
 Lei Tung I, Southern District Council constituency
 Lei Tung II, Southern District Council constituency